Acrogonia is a genus of neotropical sharpshooters belonging to the family Cicadellidae.

Selected species

Acrogonia albertoi 
Acrogonia amazonensis 
Acrogonia balloui

References

Proconiini
Hemiptera of South America
Cicadellidae genera